Metro Express Barishal (Bengali: মেট্রো এক্সপ্রেস বরিশাল) is a franchise field hockey team based in Barisal, Barisal Division, that takes part in the Hockey Champions Trophy. Founded in 2022, the team is owned by Metro Group. Ex-South Korean international Song Seung-tae serves as the head coach for the team.

History
Metro Express Barishal are one of the founding teams of the Hockey Champions Trophy, which is the country's first franchise hockey league. The club was established on 8 September 2022, by the Metro Group, a conglomerate which has been present in Bangladesh since independence.

Personnel

Current technical staff

Roster

References

Sports clubs established in 2022
Bangladesh
Hockey
Field hockey in Bangladesh